Gelbison Cilento Vallo della Lucania, commonly known as Gelbison, is an Italian association football club located in Vallo della Lucania, Campania.

History

The club was founded in 1956 as Unione Sportiva Gelbison Vallo which took its name from the  Mount Gelbison, located near Vallo della Lucania.

The team appeared in the seasons 2007–08 and 2008–09 of Serie D and has played in Eccellenza Campania until the end of the season 2010–11.

In the summer 2011 the club has acquired the sports title of A.S.D. Serre Alburni, a team newly promoted in Serie D.

Colors and badge
Its colors are red and blue.

Current squad

References

External links
Official facebook
Instagram

Football clubs in Campania
Cilento
Association football clubs established in 1956
1956 establishments in Italy